John Spencer-Churchill may refer to:

John Spencer-Churchill, 7th Duke of Marlborough (1822–1883), British statesman and nobleman
John Strange Spencer-Churchill (1880–1947), soldier and brother of the former British prime minister, Winston Churchill
John Spencer-Churchill, 10th Duke of Marlborough (1897–1972), British peer
John Spencer-Churchill (artist) (1909–1992), artist and son of John Strange Spencer-Churchill 
John Spencer-Churchill, 11th Duke of Marlborough (1926–2014), British peer
John Kemys Spencer-Churchill (1835–1913), British colonial administrator

See also
John Spencer (disambiguation)
John Churchill (disambiguation)